FC Dinamo Gagra was a Soviet football club based in Gagra, Abkhaz ASSR.

History
Like FC Dinamo Sukhumi, the club did not join the Georgian league system, and played in the Soviet Second League B until 1991. A new club, Siharuli-90 Gagra was formed to represent pro-Georgia side.

After the folding of the Soviet Union in 1991, Dinamo Gagra joined the football league in Abkhazia. After 1 cup win in Abkhazia, the side folded.

In 2006, a new club, FC Gagra was formed in, which has won the Abkhazian Premier League 3 times.

Titles
Abkhazian Cup    1 (1999)  
Abkhazia Super Cup 1 Runner-up (1999)

References

Football clubs in Georgia (country)
Football in Abkhazia